Ptychovalva obruta is a moth in the family Gelechiidae. It was described by Edward Meyrick in 1921. It is found in South Africa and Zimbabwe.

References

Chelariini
Moths described in 1921
Taxa named by Edward Meyrick